Pain Mahalleh-ye Pashaki (also Romanized as Pā’īn Maḩalleh-ye Pāshākī; also known as Pā’īn Maḩalleh, Pāshākī Pā’īn Maḩalleh, and Pāshkī-ye Pā’īn) is a village in Lafmejan Rural District, in the Central District of Lahijan County, Gilan Province, Iran. At the 2006 census, its population was 1,090, in 333 families.

References 

Populated places in Lahijan County